Chicoreus virgineus, common name the virgin murex,  is a species of sea snail, a marine gastropod mollusk in the family Muricidae, the murex snails or rock snails.

Description
The size of an adult shell varies between 60 mm and 160 mm.

Distribution
This species occurs from the Red Sea to the Bay of Bengal.

Subspecies
Chicoreus Virgineus Ponderosus (var) Sowerby 1879

References

 Lamarck, J. B. P. A., 1822 Histoire naturelle des animaux sans vertèbres, vol. 7, p. 711 pp
 Fischer, P., 1870. La faune conchyliologique marine des baies de Suez et de l'Akabah. Journal de Conchyliologie 18: 162-179
 Poirier, J., 1883. Révision des Murex. Nouvelles Archives du Muséum d'Histoire naturelle 5: 13-128, sér. série 2
 Houart, R., 1992. The genus Chicoreus and related genera (Gastropoda: Muricidae) in the Indo-West Pacific. Mémoires du Muséum national d'Histoire naturelle 154(A): 1-188

External links
 
 Fischer von W. G. (1807). Museum Demidoff, ou, Catalogue systématique et raisonné des curiosités de la nature et de l'art: données à l'Université Impériale de Moscou par son excellence Monsieur Paul de Demidoff. Moscow: Imprimerie de Université Impériale de Moscou. 3: 300pp. 6pls.
 MNHN, Paris: lectotype

Chicoreus
Gastropods described in 1798